Wyoming Highway 211 (WYO 211) is a  Wyoming State Road known as Horse Creek Road within Laramie County, and as Iron Mountain Road in Platte County.

Route description
Wyoming Highway 211 begins its south end at Wyoming Highway 219 north of Cheyenne, near I-25 and US 85/US 87 (Exit 16). Highway 211 travels west from WYO 219, and immediately intersects exit 16 of Interstate 25. At 3.8 miles, WYO 211 intersects Round Top Road, the former northern terminus of Wyoming Highway 222. WYO 211 continues west and then northwest to serve the small outlying communities of Lambert, Iron Mountain, Federal, and Horse Creek. Highway 211 temporarily ends at Milepost 42.94 as there is an approximately  gap, and resumes at Milepost 63.01. WYO 211 resumes north of the Laramie-Platte County Line along Iron Mountain Road and Jordan Road (County Route 106–2). This is the northern terminus of WYO 211.

History 

The Wyoming Highway 211 section located in Platte County was formerly designated as Wyoming Highway 322.

Major intersections

See also

 List of state highways in Wyoming

References

External links 

 Cheyenne @ AARoads.com
 Wyoming State Routes 200-299
 WYO 211 - I-25/US 87/WYO 321 to Physical Gap
 WYO 211 - Physical Gap to I-25/US 85/US 87
 WYO 211 - I-25/US 85/US 87 to WYO 219

211
211
Transportation in Laramie County, Wyoming
Transportation in Platte County, Wyoming